The Clan Mackay is a highland Scottish clan. The clan chief of Clan Mackay has from early times been designated "of Strathnaver". The chief was also from early times seated at Castle Varrich but later moved to Tongue House in Tongue, Highland. In the 17th century the chief of Clan Mackay was made Lord Reay. The following is a list of the chiefs of Clan Mackay.

References

Mackay
Clan Mackay